Padampur may refer to:
 Padampur, Rajasthan, a city in Sri Ganganagar district, Rajasthan, India
 Padampur tehsil, in Sri Ganganar district, Rajasthan, India
 Padampur, Bargarh district, a town in Bargarh district, Odisha, India
 Padampur, Jharkhand, a town in Jharkhand, India
 Padampur (Odisha Vidhan Sabha constituency), a constituency in Bargarh district, Odisha, India
 Padampur, Nepal, a village development committee in Chitwan District, Nepal
 Padmapur, a town and NAC in Bargarh district in the Koshal region of Western Odisha, India